Rubjerg Knude Lighthouse (Danish: Rubjerg Knude Fyr) is on the coast of the North Sea in , in the Jutland municipality of Hjørring in northern Denmark. It was first lit on 27 December 1900. Construction of the lighthouse began in 1899.

Description and history
Until 1908 it operated on gas which it produced from a gasworks on the site.

Shifting sands and coastal erosion are a serious problem in the area. The coast is eroded on average  a year, which can be seen most clearly at the nearby Mårup Church. Built around 1250, the church was originally  from the coast, but was dismantled in 2008 to prevent its falling into the sea.

The lighthouse ceased operating on 1 August 1968. For a number of years, the buildings were used as a museum and coffee shop, but continually shifting sands caused them to be abandoned in 2002. By 2009, the small buildings were severely damaged by the pressure of the sand and were later removed.

The cost of the move was 5 million Danish kroner (£0.6m; €0.7m; $0.75m) and was paid by Hjørring Council with government funding. The move is expected to secure the future of the lighthouse at least until around 2060.

Gallery

See also 

 List of lighthouses and lightvessels in Denmark

References

External links 

 Rubjerg Knude Vendsyssel Historiske Museum, Hjørring, Denmark
 

Lighthouses completed in 1900
Lighthouses in Denmark
Buildings and structures in Hjørring Municipality
Lighthouses of the North Sea